Porté-Puymorens is a commune in the Pyrénées-Orientales department in southern France.

Geography 
Porté-Puymorens is located in the canton of Les Pyrénées catalanes and in the arrondissement of Prades. Porté-Puymorens station has rail connections to Toulouse, Foix and Latour-de-Carol.

Population

See also
Communes of the Pyrénées-Orientales department

References

Communes of Pyrénées-Orientales